The Virginia Mason Athletic Center (VMAC) is the headquarters and practice facility of the NFL's Seattle Seahawks, in Renton, Washington, a suburb southeast of Seattle. The team holds mini-camps and training camp here. Beginning with the 2009 season, the Seahawks opened their training camp to the public.

The site is bounded by Interstate 405 to the east, Lake Washington to the west, residential properties to the north and open land area to the south. Its southern boundary is located approximately quarter-mile (400 m) north of NE 44th Street. The Eastside Rail Corridor trail runs adjacent to the facility, and connects the area with north Renton and Factoria in Bellevue.

History
The site was formerly home to a coal tar refinery and creosote plant. Seahawks owner Paul Allen purchased the land in 2000 through his company Vulcan Real Estate, with approval from the City of Renton and the state Department of Ecology. Along with the construction of the facility, an agreement was created to restore the environmental climate of the site and its wetlands by improving and redeveloping the site.

During the Seahawks' first ten seasons (1976–85), the team's headquarters was located in Kirkland at the southern end of the Lake Washington Shipyard (now Carillon Point), on the shores of Lake Washington. The summer training camps were held across the state at Eastern Washington University in Cheney, southwest of Spokane. 

When the team's new headquarters in Kirkland was completed in 1986, the Seahawks held training camp there for the next eleven seasons. While there, the players stayed in the dormitories of the adjacent Northwest College. In 1997, the team returned training camp to Cheney through 2006, then returned to Kirkland in 2007 because of the scheduled China Bowl game that was later canceled. On May 9, 2006, the Seahawks announced plans for a state-of-the-art training facility to be located along Lake Washington. The  waterfront facility, second-largest in the NFL, would be located within the northern city limits of Renton and opened in the summer of 2008.

Naming & partnership
Following plans for the new  headquarters, the Seahawks announced an expanded partnership with Virginia Mason Medical Center.

Facilities
The VMAC features four practice fields, three outdoors and one indoors. The outdoor fields are natural grass whereas the indoor field is FieldTurf. The facility also features a large berm just beside the outdoor fields for Seahawks fans to watch training camp from.

The second floor, approximately  houses the Seahawks football administration of coaching and football personnel offices, the draft room, cafeteria, and weight room mezzanine. The third floor holds Seahawks administrative offices.

The on-site parking lot holds 275 vehicles. A dock was constructed in order to accommodate boats of the team personnel.

Size

References

External links
Seattle Seahawks official website about the VMAC
Virginia Mason Medical Center

Seattle Seahawks
Buildings and structures in Renton, Washington
2008 establishments in Washington (state)
Sports venues completed in 2008
American football venues in Washington (state)